The Journal of Rehabilitation Research and Development was a peer-reviewed open access medical journal published by the Rehabilitation Research and Development Service of the Veterans Health Administration Office of Research and Development. It covered research on rehabilitation medicine. It published ten issues in print and electronic formats each year. The journal's website contains the full archive dating back to 1964. The journal was established in 1964 as the Bulletin of Prosthetics Research, obtaining its latest name in 1983. In 2017, the journal announced that it would cease publication, to be replaced with a community organised through the open access publisher PLOS.

Abstracting and indexing 
The journal has been abstracted and indexed by:

According to the Journal Citation Reports, the journal had an impact factor of 1.043 in 2015.

References

External links

Publications established in 1964
English-language journals
Open access journals
Rehabilitation medicine journals
United States Department of Veterans Affairs
Publications disestablished in 2017
1964 establishments in the United States
2017 disestablishments in the United States